Nu ABO (Nu Yeppioh) is the debut extended play by South Korean girl group f(x). It was released on May 4, 2010, in South Korea under the record label of SM Entertainment and distribution label of KMP Holdings. The extended play spawned the title track of the same name. Commercially, the EP peaked at number two on the Gaon Album Chart and sold over 54,000 copies by 2016.

Background
The title is a play on words meaning "New Blood Type": A, B and O are blood types, and if the letters are said in succession, it sounds like "ye-bbi-oh" ("").

Promotions
The title track from the EP, "Nu ABO", was chosen as the lead single. "Mr. Boogie" was re-released as a digital single on July 17, 2010 for follow-up promotions. Live performances of both "NU ABO" and "Mr Boogie" were broadcast on various local music shows Music Bank, Show! Music Core and Inkigayo during the promotional cycle. "Me+U" was also performed during the 2010 Dream Concert and on Wave K with its own choreography. A remix version of "Ice Cream" by Idiotape was also released on March 27, 2013. The title track was also used for the Korean-American film Make Your Move (2013), and was subsequently included on its soundtrack.

Commercial performance 
The extended play debuted and peaked at number 2 on the Gaon Album Chart for the week ending May 8, 2010. In its second week the album fell to number 19 and to number 21 in its third week. The album rose to number 13 in its fourth week. The extended play was the 8th best-selling album in May 2010 in South Korea. It was the 53rd best-selling album in the country during 2010, with 27,281 copies sold.

Critical reception

Track listing

Charts

Weekly charts

Year-end charts

Release history

References

External links
 

F(x) (group) albums
Albums produced by Cutfather
SM Entertainment EPs
Korean-language EPs
2010 debut EPs